The 2021-22 Kategoria e Dytë was the 50th official season of the Albanian football third division since its establishment. There were 24 teams competing this season, split in 2 groups. The winners of the groups played the league's final against each other and also gained promotion to the 2022–23 Kategoria e Parë. Teams ranked from the 2nd to the 5th position qualified to the play-off round which they played against the 11th and 12th ranked teams in the 2021–22 Kategoria e Parë. Flamurtari, Luzi 2008 and Oriku were promoted to the 2022–23 Kategoria e Parë. Flamurtari won their first Kategoria e Dytë title after beating Luzi 2008 in the final match.

Changes from last season

Team changes

From Kategoria e Dytë
Promoted to Kategoria e Parë:
 Butrinti
 Maliqi
 Shkumbini
 Tërbuni

Relegated to Kategoria e Tretë:
 Delvina
 Skrapari
 Valbona

To Kategoria e Dytë
Relegated from Kategoria e Parë:
 Elbasani
 Flamurtari
 Oriku
 Veleçiku

Promoted from Kategoria e Tretë:
 Luftëtari
 Murlani

Locations

Stadia by capacity and locations

Group A

Group B

League standings

Group A

Results

Group B

Results

Final

Group A Promotion play-offs
<onlyinclude>

Notes

Semi-finals

Final

Oriku qualified to the final play-off match.

Group B Promotion play-offs
<onlyinclude>

Semi-finals

Devolli qualified to the final as the team with the higher ranking.

Final

Devolli qualified to the final play-off match.

Relegation play-offs

Gramozi was relegated to Kategoria e Tretë, while Delvina was promoted to Kategoria e Dytë.

Top scorers

Notes

References

3
Albania
Kategoria e Dytë seasons